Short Walk On A Long Pier is the first spoken word album released by Henry Rollins. The content is culled from spoken word performances in Los Angeles, San Diego, Baton Rouge, Denver, New York City and Amsterdam. The one piece of music, "Alienation", is performed with Rowland S. Howard of The Birthday Party and Chris Haskett.

Originally, the album was a limited cassette only release of 1000, but it was re-released at least twice. It was first re-released as a vinyl record in 1989 on Lone Wolf Records and again in 2006 on 2.13.61 as a double disc with Big Ugly Mouth. In Rollins' own words, "It's just awful."

Track listing 

 Pre-Show in Holland  
 Standing Still  
 Talking to Fool / Alienation  
 Do It Alone  
 Bus Driver  
 JCC  
 The Balls Are in Your Court  
 What a Gal  
 Be Very Quiet  
 Olivia  
 Madonna  
 Bullshitting with the Friendly Dutch  
 Football  
 Barefoot & Pregnant  
 A Friend to All Women  
 The Cliff  
 It's All Rock and Roll  
 Live on Dutch Radio

References

1988 live albums
1988 debut albums
Henry Rollins live albums
Live spoken word albums
Spoken word albums by American artists
2.13.61 live albums